Horaga viola, the brown onyx, a small lycaenid or hairstreak butterfly found in Asia. It is sometimes treated as a subspecies of Horaga albimacula,

Description

See also
List of butterflies of India
List of butterflies of India (Lycaenidae)

Cited references

References
 
 
 
 

Horaga
Fauna of Pakistan
Butterflies described in 1883